Islamgulovo (İslamğol) is a rural locality (a village) in Zildyarovsky Selsoviet, Miyakinsky District, Bashkortostan, Russia. The population was 205 as of 2010. There are 6 streets.

Geography 
Islamgulovo is located 44 km southwest of Kirgiz-Miyaki (the district's administrative centre) by road. Karyshevo is the nearest rural locality.

References 

Rural localities in Miyakinsky District